Finally Famous: Born a Thug, Still a Thug is the eighth studio album by American rapper Trick Daddy. It was released on September 15, 2009 through Dunk Ryder Records. Production was handled by Gold Ru$h, Chronic Chris, Gorilla Tek, Kane Da Kameleon, Mizzle Boy, Ohzee, Schife, and The Runners among others.

It features guest appearances from Bad Guy, Ball Greezy, Benji Brown, Betty Wright, Desloc, Erin Lynn, Jackie Henton, Janet Lawrence, Kanesha Curry, Kevin Cossom, Murk Champ, Rayzor, Shonie, and the Dunk Ryders. The album debuted at number 34 on the Billboard 200 selling 13,000 copies in its first week. The album was preceded by two singles: "Why They Jock", which peaked at #89 on the Hot R&B/Hip-Hop Songs, and "This Tha Shit That I Live".

Track listing

Charts

References

External links

2009 albums
Trick Daddy albums
Albums produced by the Runners
Gangsta rap albums by American artists